USS Hopper (DDG-70) is an  guided missile destroyer of the United States Navy, named for the pioneering computer scientist Rear Admiral Grace Hopper.

Hopper is only the second US Navy warship to be named for a woman from the Navy's own ranks. This ship is the 20th destroyer of her class. Hopper was the 11th ship of this class to be built at Bath Iron Works in Bath, Maine, and construction began on 23 February 1995. She was launched and christened on 6 January 1996. On 6 September 1997, she was commissioned in San Francisco.

Service history

Deployments
Hopper has participated in multiple deployments to East Asia and the Persian Gulf, including RIMPAC 98, three individual PACMEF deployments, an Expeditionary Strike Group deployment to the Persian Gulf in 2004, and a deployment to Southeast Asia in support of Cooperation Afloat Readiness and Training (CARAT) 2006. In addition, Hopper has been foremost in the field of Ballistic Missile Defense.

On 1 April 2002, Hopper departed for a six-month deployment to the North Persian Gulf.

On 12 November 2007, Hopper departed with the  Expeditionary Strike Group for a scheduled deployment to the Fifth Fleet and Seventh Fleet.

On 6 January 2008, Hopper was involved in an incident with five gunboats of the Iranian Revolutionary Guard. The US Navy ships had been in the Arabian Sea searching for a sailor who had been missing from Hopper for 24 hours. The US Navy received a radio transmission saying, "I am coming to you. You will explode after a few minutes." As the US Navy ships prepared to fire, the Iranians abruptly turned away, the US officials said. Before leaving, the Iranians dropped white boxes into the water in front of the US Navy ships. The US Navy ships did not investigate the boxes.

Officials from the two nations differed on the severity of the incident. The Iranians claimed they were conducting normal maneuvers while American officials claimed that an imminent danger to American naval vessels existed.

On 15 April 2011, Hopper departed from Pearl Harbor on a deployment to Asia and the Middle East.

On 22 June 2014, Hopper, with her Aegis Combat System, detected and tracked a test missile launched from the Reagan Test Site on Kwajalein Atoll using her onboard AN/SPY-1 radar, providing critical targeting data to a long-range ground-based interceptor (GBI) launched from Vandenberg Air Force Base, California.  GBI's protect the US from limited long-range ballistic missile attack.

In January 2018, Hopper performed a freedom of navigation cruise, sailing within 12 nautical miles of the disputed Scarborough Shoal in the South China Sea. China, which has held the rocky outpost since seizing it from the Philippines in 2012, registered a protest on the grounds that the US Navy should have notified China in advance of its approach and had "violated China's sovereignty and security interests".

Coat of arms

Shield 
The shield has a background of blue. In the center is a gold lion with red talons.

Crest 
The crest consists of a lozenge with a silver star above the trident. Surrounding the lozenge is a wreath with lightning bolts stemming from the bottom. The crest is completed by the blue and gold framing.

Motto 
The motto is written on a scroll of white with red trim.The ships motto is "AUDE ET EFFICE" which can be translated to "DARE AND DO" within context of a command.

Seal 
The coat of arms in full color as in the blazon, upon a white background enclosed within a dark blue oval border edged on the outside with a gold rope and bearing the inscription "USS HOPPER" at the top and "DDG 70" in the base all gold.

See also
 , the first US warship named for a woman from the Navy, Lenah S. Higbee
 List of U.S. military vessels named after women

References

External links

 Video of January 2008 incident in the Strait of Hormuz

1996 ships
Destroyers of the United States
Arleigh Burke-class destroyers
Ships built in Bath, Maine